Brian Sampson (born 17 June 1935) is an Australian retired racing driver.

Sampson had a long career throughout the 1960s and 1970s, which he still continues as a hobby. Sampson was a mainstay of the Australian Motor Industries-Toyota Team at the Bathurst 500 from 1965 to 1970, winning Class A in 1969 in a Corolla.

Well noted as a collector and racer of Cheetah racing cars, he is best remembered as Peter Brock's co-driver to win the 1975 Bathurst 1000. He also won the 1977 Rothmans 500 co-driving with Warren Cullen.

Career results

Complete World Touring Car Championship results
(key) (Races in bold indicate pole position) (Races in italics indicate fastest lap)

Complete Phillip Island/Bathurst 500/1000 results

External links
Brian Sampson’s Motor Racing Retrieved from www.speco.com.au on 6 April 2009

Australian racing drivers
Bathurst 1000 winners
Australian Touring Car Championship drivers
1935 births
Living people
Australian Formula 3 Championship drivers
Formula Holden drivers
Australian Formula 2 drivers
Australian car collectors

Australian Endurance Championship drivers